The 1953 U.S. Women's Open was the eighth U.S. Women's Open, held June 25–28 at the Country Club of Rochester in Rochester, New York. It was the first U.S. Women's Open conducted by the United States Golf Association (USGA), and the final two rounds were played on Saturday.

Betsy Rawls won an 18-hole playoff on Sunday by six strokes over runner-up Jackie Pung, 71 to 77.  It was the third of eight major championships for Rawls and the second of four U.S. Women's Opens.

Patty Berg set a course record with a 71 on Thursday and was the 36-hole leader on Friday evening, eight strokes ahead of the field. Her final two rounds of 80 and 79 on Saturday dropped her to solo third, one stroke out of the playoff.

Notably absent was two-time champion Babe Zaharias, who was recovering from colon cancer surgery. She returned in 1954 and won by a record twelve strokes in her final U.S. Women's Open.

Past champions in the field

Final leaderboard
Saturday, June 27, 1953

Source:

Playoff
Sunday, June 28, 1953

Source:

References

External links
USGA final leaderboard
U.S. Women's Open Golf Championship
U.S. Women's Open – past champions – 1953
Country Club of Rochester

U.S. Women's Open
Golf in New York (state)
Sports competitions in New York (state)
Sports in Rochester, New York
U.S. Women's Open
U.S. Women's Open
U.S. Women's Open
Women's sports in New York (state)
Events in Rochester, New York